Oersdorf is a municipality in the district of Segeberg, in Schleswig-Holstein, Germany. It was founded in 1496.

References

Municipalities in Schleswig-Holstein
Segeberg